One Step Behind the Seraphim is a 2017 Romanian drama film directed by Daniel Sandu. It tells the story of Gabriel, a teenager who wants to become a priest.

References

External links 

2017 drama films
Romanian drama films